Joe Galuvao (born 8 July 1978) is a former professional rugby league footballer who played in the 1990s, 2000s and 2010s in the NRL. A Samoa and New Zealand international second row forward, he played for the Auckland Warriors, Parramatta Eels, South Sydney Rabbitohs, Penrith Panthers (with whom he won the 2003 NRL Premiership) and Manly-Warringah Sea Eagles (with whom he won the 2011 NRL Premiership).

Background
Galuvao was born in Auckland, New Zealand.

Playing career
After starting his playing career in the late 1990s with the Auckland Warriors, Galuvao was a member of the 2003 NRL premiership-winning Panthers team which defeated the Sydney Roosters in the 2003 NRL grand final. With fellow second-rower Tony Puletua, Galuvao was known as one of the "Hair Bears" and was rated one of the best second-rowers in the world in 2003. As 2003 NRL premiers, the Panthers travelled to England to face Super League VIII champions, the Bradford Bulls in the 2004 World Club Challenge. Galuvao played at second-row forward in the Panthers' 22-4 loss.

Galuvao joined South Sydney from 2006 on a three-year deal. Galuvao was released in September 2007 after a campaign to encourage him to retire, reportedly being told by Souths to swap "the paddock for the pulpit". Galuvao signed a two-year contract with Parramatta, keeping him with the Eels through the 2009 NRL season.

In the 2008 NRL season, he only played in six NRL games for Parramatta. In 2009, however he matched that total in the first six games of the season. In August, 2009, Galuvao extended his playing career by signing a three-year deal with Manly-Warringah Sea Eagles.
On October 4, 2009, Galuvao played for Parramatta in the 2009 NRL Grand Final defeat by Melbourne.  In 2010, Melbourne were subsequently stripped of the premiership they won against Parramatta for major and deliberate breaches of the salary cap.

Despite being concussed in a pre-season match, Galuvao made his debut for Manly against his old club Parramatta in round 2 of the 2010 NRL season. Galuvao won a second premiership as part of Manly's victorious 2011 NRL Grand Final squad. He, along with Shane Rodney have played in the same premiership team twice, Rodney having been a teammate of Galuvao's in Penrith's victorious 2003 NRL Grand Final squad. In 2013, after suffering a season-ending injury, Galuvao announced his retirement.

Career highlights 
 First Grade Debut: 1998 – Round 8, Auckland v Sydney Roosters at Aussie Stadium, 2 May
 Representative Selection: 2003 – Australia vs New Zealand at Aussie Stadium, 25 July
 Premierships: 2003 – member of the Grand final winning Penrith Panthers, defeated Sydney Roosters, 18–6. Galuvao won a second premiership when Manly beat the New Zealand Warriors 24-10 in the 2011 NRL Grand Final

References

External links 

Player profile

1978 births
Living people
Eastern Suburbs Tigers players
Junior Kiwis players
Manly Warringah Sea Eagles players
Manurewa Marlins players
New Zealand national rugby league team players
New Zealand sportspeople of Samoan descent
New Zealand rugby league players
New Zealand Warriors players
Parramatta Eels players
Penrith Panthers players
People educated at James Cook High School
Rugby league centres
Rugby league players from Auckland
Rugby league second-rows
Samoa national rugby league team players
South Sydney Rabbitohs players
Wentworthville Magpies players